Paul Ahmarani (born 1972) is a Canadian actor. Both his parents have a teaching background; one is from Cacouna, Bas-Saint-Laurent, Quebec and the other from the Mediterranean coast. Ahmarani is known for his roles in the movies The Left-Hand Side of the Fridge (La Moitié gauche du frigo) and How My Mother Gave Birth to Me During Menopause (Comment ma mère accoucha de moi durant sa ménopause). He has also appeared in the first season of the television Star Trek parody Dans une galaxie près de chez vous. In 2005 he released a musical album called "Portrait vivant" under the name "Paul Ahmarani et les nouveaux mariés" ("Paul Ahmarani and the Newlyweds", see the External links section to listen). Outside his acting and singing career, Paul Ahmarani has also been an open supporter of Quebec's left-wing party, Québec solidaire. On 25 February 2010, Paul Ahmarani, together with 500 artists, joined the call to support the international campaign for Boycott, Divestment, and Sanctions against the Israeli Apartheid. In 2012, audiences saw him in Martin Villeneuve's Mars et Avril, a science fiction film based on the graphic novels of the same name.

Filmography

Cinema
The Last Breath (Le Dernier souffle), 1999 — Max
Rats and Rabbits (2000) — Petru
The List (2000) — Vinnie Gomez
The Left-Hand Side of the Fridge (La Moitié gauche du frigo), 2000 — Christophe
Waterfront Dreams (Au fil de l'eau), 2002 — Michel
The Marsh (Le Marais), 2002 — Ulysse
Guys, Girls and a Jerk (Des gars, des filles et un salaud), 2003 — Eric
How My Mother Gave Birth to Me During Menopause (Comment ma mère accoucha de moi durant sa ménopause), 2003 — Jean-Charles
Life with My Father (La Vie avec mon père), 2005 — Paul Agira
Congorama, 2006 — Louis Legros
Adam's Wall, 2008 — Najeeb Gibran
A Sentimental Capitalism (Un capitalisme sentimental), 2008 — Max
Le Banquet, 2008 — director
Vampires, 2010 — Adelard
The Future Is Now!, 2011 — The Man of Today
 Mars and April (Mars et Avril), 2012 — Arthur
The Cyclotron (Le Cyclotron), 2016 — König
Family First (Chien de garde), 2018
Les Salopes, or the Naturally Wanton Pleasure of Skin, 2018
Genesis (Genèse), 2018
Ville Neuve, 2018
Arlette, 2022

Television 
Dans une galaxie près de chez vous (1999) .... Falbo Gotta
Quadra (2000) .... Roch
Tag (2000) .... Wiper
Bunker, le cirque (2002) .... Patrick Sénécal 
Fortier (2003) .... Jacynthe / Raoul
Marie-Antoinette (TV movie, 2006) .... Léonard
La Job (2006) .... Sam Bisaillon
Trauma (2011) .... Steve McGinnis
Unité 9 2015-16 ... Francois Beaudry

Discography 
Portrait vivant (2005)

See also 
List of Quebec actors
List of Quebec musicians
Cinema of Quebec
Culture of Quebec

References

External links 

Samples of album Portrait vivant to listen
 Radio-Canada: Fréquence Libre, interview with Paul Ahmarani (12 September 2005)
NorthernStars: Paul Ahmarani filmography

Living people
1972 births
21st-century Canadian male actors
Audiogram (label) artists
Best Actor Jutra and Iris Award winners
Canadian male television actors
Canadian male film actors
Musicians from Quebec
Male actors from Quebec